Yuri (Georgy) Aleksandrovich Zhukov (also Георгий Александрович Жуков; 23 April 1908, Almazna – 31 May 1991, Moscow) was a Soviet journalist, publicist and political figure.

Member of the Communist Party of the Soviet Union. Around 1938-1945 he toured Dalkrai and wrote books on Soviet Far East and Japan.

Later, he sat on the editorial board of Soviet daily Pravda (1946-1987); he was also a columnist of the paper. Zhukov served as the newspaper's Paris correspondent in 1948-1952. From 1952 to 1957 he was the Deputy Editor-in-Chief of the newspaper.

In 1957 he became the first Chairman of the powerful State Committee for Cultural Relations with Foreign Countries (GKKS), an organ that took sizable portion of responsibilities from the Soviet Foreign Ministry from 1957 to 1967. Zhukov would oversee preparations and signing of the first agreement on cultural exchanges with the United States (Lacy-Zarubin act, signed in January 1958) and the Soviet national exhibition in New York in summer 1959. He also hosted Vice President Richard Nixon on an unofficial visit to the Soviet Union July 23 - August 2, 1959 to open the American National Exhibition in Sokolniki Park in Moscow.

In the late 1950s he was a speechwriter for Soviet leader Nikita Khrushchev.

Deputy Chairman of the Soviet Peace Committee (1962-1982) and Chairman (1982-1987).

He was a candidate member of the Central Committee of the Communist Party of the Soviet Union.

References 

1908 births
1991 deaths
20th-century Russian journalists
People from Slavyanoserbsky Uyezd
Central Committee of the Communist Party of the Soviet Union candidate members
Central Committee of the Communist Party of the Soviet Union members
Sixth convocation members of the Supreme Soviet of the Soviet Union
Seventh convocation members of the Supreme Soviet of the Soviet Union
Eighth convocation members of the Supreme Soviet of the Soviet Union
Ninth convocation members of the Supreme Soviet of the Soviet Union
Tenth convocation members of the Supreme Soviet of the Soviet Union
Eleventh convocation members of the Soviet of Nationalities
Heroes of Socialist Labour
Recipients of the Order of Friendship of Peoples
Recipients of the Order of Lenin
Recipients of the Order of the Red Banner of Labour
Recipients of the Order of the Red Star
Lenin Prize winners
French–Russian translators
Russian male journalists
Russian translators
Soviet journalists
Soviet translators
Burials in Troyekurovskoye Cemetery